Wentworth railway station was a railway station on the Sheffield to Barnsley route of the Midland Railway. The station has been known as Wentworth and Tankersley and  Wentworth and Hoyland Common during its life.

History
The station was situated at the north end of the Tankersley Tunnel, adjacent to the road bridge. Built on an embankment, the platforms and the station building were high above the road with the station master's house, which still stands at road level.

The station was some considerable distance from Wentworth, Hoyland Common and Tankersley, and far from walking distance. Its most regular passengers were the miners of Skiers Spring Colliery, situated on the other side of the road bridge, coming on and off shift.

The station closed on 2 November 1959.

Route

References

 "A Railway Chronology of the Sheffield Area", Edited by Richard V. Proctor, Sheffield City Libraries, 1975.

External links
 Wentworth station on navigable O. S. map

Disused railway stations in Barnsley
Former Midland Railway stations
Railway stations in Great Britain opened in 1897
Railway stations in Great Britain closed in 1959